Cy Young (1867–1955) was a Major League Baseball pitcher who played from 1890 to 1911.

Cy Young may also refer to:
Harry Young (American football) or Cy Young (1893–1977), College Football Hall of Fame inductee
Cy Young (animator) (1897–1964), Chinese American special effects animator
Cy Young (athlete) (1928–2017), American Olympic Gold medalist in the javelin throw

See also
Cy Young Award, an annual award for baseball pitchers named after the pitcher Cy Young